"Stranger in Town" is a 1965 song by Del Shannon. Written by Shannon, it is the opening track on One Thousand Six-Hundred Sixty-One Seconds of Del Shannon. It was released as a single, a follow-up (both chronologically and thematically) to Shannon's top-ten hit "Keep Searchin' (We'll Follow the Sun)", but was not as successful, reaching No. 30 on the Billboard Hot 100 chart in the USA and No. 40 on the UK's Record Retailer chart. "Stranger in Town" was Shannon's last top 40 hit of the 1960s.

Dave Marsh, in his 1989 book The Heart of Rock & Soul: The 1001 Greatest Singles Ever Made, ranked "Stranger in Town"' as the 327th best rock or soul single to that date, ahead of Shannon's bigger hits "Keep Searching" (371st in Marsh's book) and "Runaway" (534th).

Howard DeWitt's biography of Shannon is titled "Stranger in Town" after the song.

References

Songs written by Del Shannon
Del Shannon songs
1965 songs
1965 singles